The Tiffin School Boat Club (also known as TSBC) is an amateur rowing club, based in London, run by Tiffin School. It is based on the River Thames at Kingston upon Thames on the outskirts of Greater London in south-east England between Kingston Bridge and Teddington Lock. 

Rowers enjoy one of the longest and calmest stretches of rowing water in the UK; 4.81 miles (7.74km) between Molesey Lock upstream to the south and downstream to Teddington Lock.

Activities
TSBC, Kingston Rowing Club and Kingston Student Rowing Club share the boathouse located in Canbury Gardens on the Surrey bank, overlooking Steven's Eyot downstream. The site lease was renewed in 2010.

In the past it has hosted the Tiffin Small Boats Head. The club also organise a biennial sponsored row from Oxford to Kingston; the "OK Row".

The current head coach at the club is Alex DiLuzio, whilst the boatman, David White, manages all the club's equipment. The club has managed in the past to qualify boats for the Henley Royal Regatta. 

The boat club usually accepts members of age groups J14 to J18 (or students in years 9 to 13). Generally, a series of tests compromising of ergometer trials, as well as a run, sees 30 students who trial in year 9 join the boat club. However, it is generally possible for willing students to join, without trial, later on in the school.  The boat club will also accept younger members if they have previous rowing or sculling experience. Members may also continue to participate in TSBC activities after leaving Tiffin School.

Since 2011, the boat club has also accepted girls from the sister school, The Tiffin Girls' School.  It is one of the few school rowing clubs in the state sector.

Honours

Henley Royal Regatta

British champions

See also
 Rowing on the River Thames

References

External links
  Tiffin School Boat Club official website
 British Rowing TSBC web page
  Tiffin School Website

Rowing clubs of the River Thames
Sport in the Royal Borough of Kingston upon Thames
Scholastic rowing in the United Kingdom